Mayan (or Mayan EDMS) is a web-based free/libre document management system for managing documents within an organization.
 All functionality is available in its free public version.
It has an active community of volunteers and third-party service and support providers.

Its largest installation as of June 2012 is Puerto Rico's main permit agency (20,000+ documents).

History and features 
Mayan started as a project whose only requirement was the storage of PDF files for a government agency transitioning to an all electronic registration process and has grown into a general system since then.

It is designed to be easy to migrate to different physical computers.  It is written in Python using the Django framework. Features include document versioning,
electronic signature verification,
multilingual support,
discussion tools,
user-defined metadata and unique identifiers, 
and roles support.

Mayan EDMS was featured on the free software / open source (FLOSS) themed podcast FLOSS Weekly episode 253 aired on May 29, 2013.

See also
 Document Management
 List of content management systems
 List of collaborative software

References

External links
 
 
 Online documentation
 Mayan Google+ page and  discussion group
 

Reviews
 Mayan review (English)
 Sistema de Gestión Documental (Spanish)
 личный опыт  (Russian)
 Gescande documenten beheren met Mayan EDMS (Dutch)
 Linux at the office - Mayan EDM: open source document management (Dutch)
 Finances Online

Document management systems
Free groupware
Free business software